The Debrecen Neological Synagogue was a Jewish religious building in Debrecen, Hungary.

The large synagogue in Deák Ferenc Street was built in 1896 according to the plans of Jakob Gartner, a Jew in Vienna. Although the brick-walled, double-towered, domed synagogue did not stand on the street line, it was easily visible from the large square in front of it. Its façade formation was characterized by a strong triple articulation, and its mass became plastic and articulated by the strong, risalit-like protrusions of its edges. It suffered damage during World War II. Renovation began in 1949, however, during the roofing work, the attic caught fire and the building burned down. The city authority then decided to demolish it.

Sources 
 (szerk.) Gerő László: Magyarországi zsinagógák, Műszaki Könyvkiadó, Budapest, 1989, 147–149. o.
 https://haon.hu/debrecen-hirei/olvasoi-level-a-bizanci-mor-stilusban-epult-zsinagogarol-3240304/
 http://magyarzsido.hu/index.php?option=com_catalogue&view=detail&id=83&Itemid=20

Synagogues in Hungary
Neolog Judaism synagogues